Gilmer Building is a historic commercial building located at Winston-Salem, Forsyth County, North Carolina.  It was built between 1924 and 1926, and is a two-story, rectangular brick building.  It measures 80 feet by 86 feet, and features polychromed terra cotta panels and ornamentation.

It was listed on the National Register of Historic Places in 1982.

References

Commercial buildings on the National Register of Historic Places in North Carolina
Commercial buildings completed in 1926
Buildings and structures in Winston-Salem, North Carolina
National Register of Historic Places in Winston-Salem, North Carolina